Suchao Nuchnum  (born May 17, 1983) is a Thai professional footballer who plays as a midfielder of Kanchanaburi City  of the Thai League 3.

Club career
Before becoming a footballer, Suchao was a Muay Thai boxer. His ring name of "Kobnoi Sor. Sakunpan" (กบน้อย ส.สกุลภัณฑ์) led to his nickname of "Kob" (กบ; literally "frog"). Suchao spent his youth career with TOT S.C. starting from the 2002-2003 season. He later signed his first professional contract with the club and made his first senior appearance in 2004. He totally spent 5 years with the club until 2009, made 84 appearances with 33 goals before moving abroad to Indonesian club, Persib Bandung.

The winger played a season with the Indonesians before returning to his homeland's club, Buriram United F.C. (was Buriram PEA at the time). Suchao was promoted to captain and has been playing regularly for the team in different matches.

International career
Suchao Nuchnum was first called up for the U-23 squad in 2005 before promoted to senior squad later in the same year. He was part of the 2010 AFF Suzuki Cup squad. In 2013, he was called up to the national team by Surachai Jaturapattarapong to the 2015 AFC Asian Cup qualification.

International goals

Honours

Club
TOT
 Thai Division 1 League (1): 2003
 Provincial League (1): 2006

Buriram United
 Thai League 1 (6): 2011 2013 2014, 2015, 2017, 2018
 Thai FA Cup (4): 2011, 2012, 2013, 2015
 Thai League Cup (5): 2011, 2012, 2013, 2015, 2016 
 Thailand Champions Cup (1): 2019
 Toyota Premier Cup (3): 2012, 2014, 2016
 Kor Royal Cup (4): 2013, 2014, 2015 2016
 Mekong Club Championship (1): 2015

International
Thailand U-23
 Sea Games  Gold Medal (1); 2005

Thailand
 King's Cup (2): 2006, 2007
 T&T Cup (1): 2008

Individual
 Thai Premier League Player of the Month (1): October 2014
 Thai Premier League Player of the Year (1): 2014

References

External links
 
 Suchao Nuchnum profile at Buriram United website
 

1983 births
Living people
Suchao Nuchnum
Suchao Nuchnum
Suchao Nuchnum
Association football midfielders
Suchao Nuchnum
Persib Bandung players
Suchao Nuchnum
Suchao Nuchnum
Liga 1 (Indonesia) players
Thai expatriate footballers
Thai expatriate sportspeople in Indonesia
Expatriate footballers in Indonesia
Suchao Nuchnum
Suchao Nuchnum
Footballers at the 2006 Asian Games
2007 AFC Asian Cup players
Suchao Nuchnum
Southeast Asian Games medalists in football
Competitors at the 2005 Southeast Asian Games
Suchao Nuchnum
Suchao Nuchnum